Alessandro Tuia (born 8 June 1990) is an Italian professional footballer who plays as a centre-back for  club Lecce.

Club career
Tuia is a product of the Lazio youth academy and former captain of the Primavera youth team, being invited to train with the senior side in the 2008-09 season. He made his Serie A debut on 31 May 2009, when he came off the bench in the second half of Lazio's 2–0 defeat to Juventus in the Stadio Olimpico di Torino.

In the summer 2009 he has been loaned to Lega Pro Prima Divisione (Italian third tier) club Monza, in order to gain first team experience. The loan was extended in summer 2010.

In August 2011, he joined Foligno in the Lega Pro Prima Divisione in co-ownership deal and at the end of the season, he came back to Lazio, and then he was immediately sold to Salernitana in another co-ownership deal.

In June 2014 Lazio gave up the remain 50% registration rights of Tuia.

On 5 June 2018, Tuia signed for Benevento for free.

On 14 June 2021, he signed a contract with Lecce for a term of two years with an optional third year.

International career
Tuia was the captain of the Italia U17 national team.

References

External links 
 Official SSLazio.it Profile
 Official FIGC International Statistics 

1990 births
Living people
Sportspeople from the Province of Viterbo
Italian footballers
Footballers from Lazio
Association football defenders
Italy youth international footballers
Serie A players
Serie B players
Serie C players
S.S. Lazio players
A.C. Monza players
A.S.D. Città di Foligno 1928 players
U.S. Salernitana 1919 players
Benevento Calcio players
U.S. Lecce players